Gerard McGrattan (born 1972) is an Irish former hurler who played as a right wing-forward for the Down senior team.

McGrattan made his first appearance for the team during the 1992 championship and quickly became a regular player until his retirement at the end of the 2004 championship. During that time he won three Ulster winners' medals and remains the only Down hurler to have won an All Stars Award.

At club level McGrattan played with Portaferry, winning seven county championship winners' medals during a club career that spanned three decades.

Honours
 Ulster Senior Hurling Championship (3) 1992 1995 1997
 National Hurling League Division 2 (1) 2004
 Ulster Under-21 Hurling Championship (1) 1990
 Ulster Minor Hurling Championship (1) 1989
 Ulster Minor Hurling Championship (1) 1989
 Antrim Senior Hurling League (2) 2002 2003
 Down Senior Hurling Championship (7) 1989 1991 1996 2000 2001 2002 2006

References

1972 births
Living people
Down inter-county hurlers
People from Portaferry
Portaferry hurlers
Ulster inter-provincial hurlers